Firbank is a civil parish in the South Lakeland District of Cumbria, England.  It contains 15 listed buildings that are recorded in the National Heritage List for England.  Of these, one is listed at Grade II*, the middle of the three grades, and the others are at Grade II, the lowest grade.  The parish is almost completely rural, with no settlements of significant size.  The listed buildings consist of farmhouses, farm buildings, houses, bridges, mileposts, a burial ground, and a church.


Key

Buildings

References

Citations

Sources

Lists of listed buildings in Cumbria